Steve Burton (born June 28, 1970) is an American actor, best known for his portrayal of Jason Morgan on General Hospital from 1991 to 2012 and 2017 to 2021, and Dylan McAvoy on The Young and the Restless from 2013 to 2017. He also voiced the character Cloud Strife in a wide range of Square Enix products, including Final Fantasy VII: Advent Children and the Kingdom Hearts series. In 2017, Burton returned to General Hospital in the role of Jason Morgan using the alias of "Patient 6." In 2019, he also briefly stepped into the role of Jason's twin brother, Drew Cain (Billy Miller) in various flashbacks with Shiloh Archer (Coby Ryan McLaughlin).

Career
Burton got his break as surfer Chris Fuller on Out of This World in 1987, and later appeared as Harris Michaels on Days of Our Lives in 1988. In the 1990s he studied acting at Theater Theater in Hollywood, California and was coached by Jon Cedar and Chris Aable. Burton began playing Jason Morgan on the daytime soap opera General Hospital in 1991, and won a Daytime Emmy Award for Outstanding Supporting Actor in a Drama Series in 1998. In 2007, Burton also appeared as Jason in the first season of General Hospital: Night Shift.

Burton appeared in the science fiction miniseries Taken and in the movie The Last Castle in 2001 with Robert Redford and James Gandolfini. Additionally Burton is the voice actor of Cloud Strife in the Kingdom Hearts series and much of the Compilation of Final Fantasy VII. He has voiced Cloud in the game Kingdom Hearts and its sequel, Kingdom Hearts II. He is in the CGI movie Final Fantasy VII: Advent Children and the video games Dirge of Cerberus: Final Fantasy VII, Crisis Core: Final Fantasy VII, Dissidia Final Fantasy, and Dissidia 012 Final Fantasy.

On August 28, 2012, Burton confirmed that he would exit General Hospital in October. On January 29, 2013, he joined the cast of The Young and the Restless as Dylan McAvoy. On October 6, 2016, Burton announced via social media that he would not renew his deal with the soap and would exit the role of Dylan. He was subsequently awarded another Daytime Emmy Award for Outstanding Supporting Actor for his The Young and the Restless role in 2017. In June 2017, ABC Daytime announced that Burton would be returning to General Hospital. In November 2021, Burton was fired from General Hospital due to his refusal to comply with the production's COVID-19 vaccine mandate. In April 2022, it was announced Burton had joined the cast of Days of Our Lives: Beyond Salem in his former Days of Our Lives role as Harris Michaels.

Personal life
Burton was born in Indianapolis, Indiana. He grew up in the Cleveland, Ohio, suburb of Richmond Heights before he moved to Hollywood. He graduated from Beverly Hills High School in Beverly Hills, California.

Burton married Sheree Gustin on January 16, 1999. They have three children: two daughters and a son. In May 2022, Burton announced he and Gustin had separated and that he is not the father of the child Gustin is pregnant with. Burton filed for divorce in July 2022, citing March 1 as their date of separation and 'irreconcilable differences' as the reason for the divorce. Burton is seeking joint legal custody of the children he and Gustin share.

Burton appeared on High Stakes Poker season three and donated his earnings to his fan club to build a clubhouse.

Filmography

Awards and nominations

References

External links
ABC Daytime: General Hospital

Living people
20th-century American male actors
21st-century American male actors
American male soap opera actors
American male television actors
American male video game actors
American male voice actors
Beverly Hills High School alumni
Daytime Emmy Award for Outstanding Supporting Actor in a Drama Series winners
Daytime Emmy Award winners
Male actors from Beverly Hills, California
Male actors from Cleveland
Male actors from Indianapolis
1970 births